iTunes Originals – Barenaked Ladies is a 2006 iTunes Originals release from the band Barenaked Ladies. The 27-track release features four previously released album songs, ten exclusive new recordings of songs, thirteen spoken word tracks, and the iTunes Originals introduction track. The material spans the band's entire career.

Contents
The live songs and the interviews were recorded at Steven Page's Fresh Baked Woods studio while the band was recording the bed tracks for Barenaked Ladies Are Me. The songs represent the band's career fairly comprehensively, including songs from each of their albums to that point, four songs ("Be My Yoko Ono", "Alternative Girlfriend", "One Week", and "For You") recorded acoustically around one microphone ("Alternative Girlfriend" and "One Week" in their alternate bluegrass versions), a new song ("I Can I Will I Do") from the album they were recording at the time, and a song performed solo by bassist Jim Creeggan. The introductory track features background music that appears to be drawn from the song "Maybe You're Right", which was among the songs being recorded for the new album.

The spoken word tracks are mainly by frontmen Steven Page and Ed Robertson together, though one ("Feeling Twitterpated"), preceding his own song, is by Creeggan. The tracks discuss the band's history, from the meeting of founding members Page and Robertson through many of the major milestones thereafter. The tracks also discuss the significance and meaning of the songs featured in the release.

Track listing

Barenaked Ladies albums
Barenaked Ladies
2006 live albums
2006 compilation albums